The 2017 season is Suphanburi's 7th season in the Thai League T1 by 2006–2007 and since 2013.

Thai League

Thai FA Cup

Thai League Cup

Reserve team in Thai League 4

Suphanburi send the reserve team to compete in T4 Western Region as Suphanburi B.

Squad goals statistics

Transfers
First Thai footballer's market was open on December 14, 2016, to January 28, 2017.
Second Thai footballer's market is opening on June 3, 2017, to June 30, 2017.

In

Out

Loan in

Notes

References

External links
 Suphanburi F.C. official website
 Thai League official website

Suphanburi F.C. seasons
Association football in Thailand lists
SUP